Marc-Édouard Vlasic (born March 30, 1987) is a Canadian professional ice hockey defenceman for the San Jose Sharks of the National Hockey League (NHL). Nicknamed "Steady Eddie", Vlasic holds the team record for most games played by a defenceman for the Sharks.

Playing career

San Jose Sharks (2006–present)

Vlasic was drafted by the San Jose Sharks 35th overall in the 2005 NHL Entry Draft, using a pick exchanged for goaltender Miikka Kiprusoff. Vlasic attended high school at Collège Sainte-Anne High School for three years, then a one-year stint at West Island College before making the jump to the Quebec Major Junior Hockey League (QMJHL), where he played three seasons of major junior hockey with the Quebec Remparts. He won the Memorial Cup with Quebec in 2006.

On August 27, 2008, the San Jose Sharks signed Vlasic to a four-year, $12.4 million contract extension that would keep him with the team through the 2012–13 NHL season. On July 11, 2012, the Sharks signed Vlasic to a 5-year, $21 million contract extension that will keep him with the Sharks through the 2017–2018 NHL season. Vlasic played only one game in the minors for the Worcester Sharks, in 2008, where he notched 2 points.

In the 2012–13 season, Vlasic became the second player from the 2005 draft class to play 500 games, and scored his first career playoff goal in game 2 against Jonathan Quick of the Los Angeles Kings.

On July 1, 2017 he signed a $56 million, eight-year contract extension with the Sharks.

Vlasic played his 1,000th NHL game on December 14, 2019.

International play

Vlasic was named to the 2014 Canadian Olympic Hockey Team where his team won Gold against Sweden 3–0.

Following the Sharks defeat by the Vegas Golden Knights in the second round of the 2018 Stanley Cup playoffs, Vlasic was invited to play for Team Canada at the 2018 IIHF World Championship.

Personal life
Of Croatian descent, Marc-Édouard has three younger brothers: Thomas, Charles, and James, the last two being twins. He attended West Island College in Quebec. He married his high school sweetheart, Martine. His cousin, Emma Vlasic, plays for the Connecticut Whale of the Premier Hockey Federation, and was former captain of Yale's women's hockey team, and her younger brother, Alex, plays for the Chicago Blackhawks.

The Quebec Remparts retired Vlasic's number 44 in 2015.

Career statistics

Regular season and playoffs

International

References

External links

1987 births
Canadian expatriate ice hockey players in the United States
Canadian ice hockey defencemen
Canadian people of Croatian descent
French Quebecers
Ice hockey people from Montreal
Ice hockey players at the 2014 Winter Olympics
Living people
Medalists at the 2014 Winter Olympics
Olympic gold medalists for Canada
Olympic ice hockey players of Canada
Olympic medalists in ice hockey
Quebec Remparts players
San Jose Sharks draft picks
San Jose Sharks players
Worcester Sharks players